Vanadocene dichloride is an organometallic complex with formula (η5-C5H5)2VCl2 (commonly abbreviated as Cp2VCl2). It is a structural analogue of titanocene dichloride but with vanadium(IV) instead of titanium(IV). This compound has one unpaired electron, hence Cp2VCl2 is paramagnetic. Vanadocene dichloride is a suitable precursor for variety of bis(cyclopentadienyl)vanadium(IV) compounds.

Preparation
Cp2VCl2 was first prepared by Wilkinson and Birmingham via the reaction of NaC5H5 and VCl4 in THF.

Reactions and use
The compound has been used in organic synthesis.

Reduction of vanadocene dichloride gives vanadocene, (C5H5)2V.

Like titanocene dichloride, this organovanadium compound was investigated as a potential anticancer drug.  It was conjectured to function by interactions with the protein transferrin.

References

Metal halides
Metallocenes
Organovanadium compounds
Chloro complexes
Cyclopentadienyl complexes